Vladislav Shoot (Vladislav Alekseyevich Shut'  (also spelled Chout, Schut, Sciut, Shut or Szut); 3 March 1941 – 9 March 2022) was a Russian-British composer of contemporary classical music. Born in Voznesensk, Soviet Union, now Ukraine, he moved to the United Kingdom in the early 1990s, settling on the artists' estate of Dartington Hall.

Biography 
He was born Vladislav Shut in Voznesensk, Soviet Union, to Valentina (née Nizovaya) and Alexei Shut, an officer in the navy. He was raised in Sevastopol, where he attended School N14.

Shoot studied composition with Nikolai Peiko at the Gnessin Music Institute (the present-day Russian Academy of Music) in Moscow, graduating in 1967. From 1967 to 1982 he worked as the music editor at the Sovetsky Kompozitor publishers in Moscow. In 1982, he turned to freelance composing, earning his living by writing film scores. In 1990, Shoot – together with a small group of Moscow composers headed by Edison Denisov – founded the Association for Contemporary Music, a revival of a post-Revolutionary avant-garde composers' association of the same name.

In 1992 he came to Dartington Hall, England, as a composer-in-residence, in which capacity he served until 1995, and remained a resident of the estate. Shoot's music is published by M.P. Belaieff – Edition Peters (Frankfurt-am-Main)/Schott (Mainz). Individual works have also been published by Boosey & Hawkes and Hans Sikorski.

He married the artist Irina Karpey in 1970. His son Eliahu (Eli) Shoot is also a composer, teaching at Tulane University, and his daughter Veronika (Nika Shoot) is a pianist.

Shoot died on 9 March 2022.

Music 
Shoot's works met with much admiration in the West from the 1980s onward. He preferred smaller ensembles, up to a chamber orchestra, which he tied into sound compositions or groups of overlapping sound layers. Even his symphonies, excepting the High Cross Symphony (1998), are chamber symphonies. He retained serial processes, used post-Romantic elements, and quoted composers of the past, with Alban Berg as the clearest influence. Shoot allowed performers of his works a certain freedom of interpretation within the bounds of a controlled aleatoric technique.

His music has been performed at numerous venues and festivals throughout Europe, as well as in South Korea and the United States. The music written in the UK has been performed by leading British ensembles and orchestras, including the BBC Symphony Orchestra, the Philharmonia Orchestra, and Sinfonia 21. An 80th birthday celebration concert took place on 29 June 2021 at St George's, Bloomsbury in London.

Selected works

Orchestral 
 Sinfonia da Camera No. 3, flute, oboe, 2 ensembles (percussion, strings), 1978
 Romantic Messages, flute, bassoon, prepared piano, string orchestra, 1979
 Largo Sinfonia, organ, small orchestra (15 players), 1981
 Warum? , small orchestra (15 players), 1986
 Ex Animo, large orchestra, 1988
 Sinfonia da Camera No. 4, tam-tam, strings, 1992
 Sinfonia da Camera No. 5, small orchestra (16 players), 1992
 Serenade, string orchestra, 1995
 Divertimento, recorder, vibraphone, string orchestra, 1997
 High-Cross Symphony, large orchestra, 1998
 Sinfonia da Camera No. 6, string orchestra, percussion, 2005

Chamber music 
 Sonata-fantasia, violin, piano, 1969, revised 2001
 Cuckoo's Rhymes (20 Miniatures for Children), violin, piano, 1969, revised 1999
 Sonata, cello, 1970, revised 1999
 Youth Album, violin, piano, 1971, revised 1999
 Sinfonia da Camera No. 1, 4 celli, double bass, timpani, 1973
 Sinfonia da Camera No. 2, flute, oboe, clarinet, saxophone, bassoon, viola, cello, double bass, 1975
 Five Easy Pieces, French horn, piano, 1976, revised 2001
 Sonata Breve, flute, 1977
 Trio, bassoon, cello, percussion, 1978
 Solo per Fagotto, bassoon, 1978
 Metamorphosis, saxophone, harp, double bass, percussion, 1979
 Trio, 2 clarinets, bass clarinet, 1982
 Parable, 6 percussion, 1983
 Espressivo, flute, oboe, violin, cello, piano, 1984
 Epitaph, French horn, 2 trumpets, trombone, tuba, 1984
 Mini-partita, viola, piano, 1987
 Four Versions, bassoon, string quartet, 1990 (also arranged for bassoon, violin, viola, cello, 1996)
 Offering, violin, cello, piano, 1991
 Serenade, string quartet, 1994
 Pantomime, flute, harpsichord, 1995
 Con Passione, string quartet, piano, 1995
 Amoroso, clarinet, string quartet, 1996
 Chaconne, accordion, 1999
 Pastorale, flute, oboe, clarinet, bassoon, piano, 2002
 Eternal Rest, 3 percussion, 2002
 Suite, string quartet, 2003
 Three Encounters with Shostakovich, clarinet, horn, string quartet, piano, percussion, 2006

Choral 
 She came and went (text by James Russell Lowell), mixed chorus, 2001 (also version for mixed chorus, soprano recorder, 2001);
 Two Holy Sonnets (text by John Donne), mixed chorus, 2003

Vocal 
 Two songs of Robert Burns (translated by Samuil Marshak), mezzo-soprano, piano, 1964, revised 2002;
 Six Poems by Sergei Gorodetsky , high voice, piano, 1970
 Gleam of Light (text by Boris Pasternak), middle voice, piano, 1988
 Vorgefühl (text by Rainer Maria Rilke), high voice, 2 clarinets, viola, cello, double bass, 1993
 Four Songs on Words by P.B. Shelley , soprano, string quartet, 1994
 Three Songs on Words by Osip Mandelstam , high voice, flute, clarinet, string quartet, 1994
 Day and Night (text by Fyodor Tyutchev), high voice, recorder, string quartet, 2000
 The Miller's Daughter (text from an English folk ballad), soprano, clarinet, percussion, 2001

Piano 
 Silhouettes, 1973
 Sonatina, 1974, revised 2002
 Children's Album, 1975, revised 1995

Organ 
 Confession, 1993, revised 2000

Films scored 
Privet s fronta (1983) (TV) Привет с фронта "Note from the Front"
Tayna zemli (1985) Тайна земли "The Earth's Secret"
Karusel na bazarnoy ploshchadi (1986) Карусель на базарной площади "Carousel at the Bazaar Square"
Pro lyubov, druzhbu i sud'bu (1987) Про любовь, дружбу и судьбу "Of Love, Friendship and Fate"
Amulanga (1987)
Korabl (1988) Корабль "The Ship"
Mest (1989) Месть "Revenge", ("The Red Flute": International/English title)
Karyer (1990) Карьер "Sand-Pit"
Garem Stepana Guslyakova (1990) Гарем Степана Гуслякова "Stepan Ghusliakov's Harem"
Tsareubiytsa (1991) Цареубийца "The Assassin of the Tsar"
Lyuk (1991) Люк "The Hatch"
Serebryannye Lozhki (1991) Серебряные Ложки "Silver Spoons"
Sumashedshaya Liubov (1992) Сумасшедшая Любовь "Crazy Love"

Discography 
Romantic Messages. Valery Popov, bassoon; Valery Polyansky/Moscow Conservatory Orchestra (Melodiya, 1980) (LP)
Four Versions. Valery Popov, bassoon; Vladimir Ponkin/Moscow Contemporary Music Ensemble (Mezhdunarodnaya Kniga: MK 417036, 1991)
Warum? Alexey Vinogradov/Moscow Contemporary Music Ensemble (Olympia: OCD 283, 1991)
Trio. Valery Popov, bassoon; Natalia Savinova, cello; Alexander Suvorov, percussion (Olympia: OCD 297, 1993)
Three Songs on Words by Osip Mandelstam. Katia Kichigina, soprano; Oxalys Ensemble (Explicit! Records: E! 99004, 2000)
Ex Animo; Sinfonia da Camera No. 5; High-Cross Symphony. Vladimir Ponkin/Rachmaninov Symphony Orchestra (Sojuz: CD0001, 2003)
Four Songs on Words by P.B. Shelley. Elena Vassilieva, soprano; Quatuor Sine Nomine (Claves: CD 50–2303, 2003)
Miniature Partita. Filip Davidse, saxophone; Naomi Tamura, piano. in "The Soviet Saxophone" (Opus 35: OP3501, 2008)

References

Bibliography 
 Holopova, Valentina. Secrets of the Moscow Composition School in Vladislav Shoot's "Pure Music" in: «Ex oriente...III»: Eight Composers from the former USSR, ed. V. Tsenova (studia slavica musicologica, vol. 31) (Berlin: Ernst Kuhn, 1997), 
 Lobanova, Marina. Musical Styla and Genre: History and Modernity (Amsterdam: Harwood Academic Publishers, 2000), pp. 167–9.
 McBurney, Gerard. "Vladislav Shoot", The New Grove Dictionary of Music and Musicians ed. S. Sadie and J. Tyrrell (London: Macmillan, 2001), vol. 23, pp. 275–6.

External links 
 Classical composers
 Composers 21
 Ernst Kuhn
 Hans Sikorski
 
 Mini Partita for Cello and Piano performed by Alisa Liubarskaya and Veronika Shoot

1941 births
2022 deaths
20th-century classical composers
21st-century classical composers
British people of Russian descent
British classical composers
British male classical composers
Gnessin State Musical College alumni
Russian classical composers
Russian male classical composers
Russian film score composers
British male film score composers
20th-century British composers
20th-century British male musicians
21st-century British male musicians
People from Voznesensk